Acrolophus is a genus of moths in the family Acrolophidae, with, typically, great individual variation within species in color pattern, making field identification of many individuals difficult or impossible. It was described by Felipe Poey in 1832.

Species

References

 , 2010: Name-bearing Types of Lepidoptera (Insecta), excluding Rhopalocera, in the National Museums of Scotland, Edinburgh. Zootaxa 2394: 1-22. Abstract: .

 
Acrolophidae
Taxa named by Felipe Poey